Claud Cassius Aspinwall (January 1, 1873 – October 26, 1944) was an American politician in the state of Washington. He served in the Washington House of Representatives. He served as Speaker from 1933 to 1935 and from 1945 to 1947.

References

Republican Party members of the Washington House of Representatives
1873 births
1944 deaths